Bursaria longisepala is a species of flowering plant in the family Pittosporaceae and is endemic to New South Wales. It is a spiny, sprawling shrub with narrowly elliptic leaves clustered around spiny side-shoots, flowers with relatively large sepals, five spreading white petals and five stamens, and concave fruit.

Description

Taxonomy
Bursaria longisepala was first formally described in 1926 by Karel Domin in the journal Bibliotheca Botanica from specimens he collected in the Blue Mountains in 1910.

Distribution and habitat
This bursaria mostly grows on south-facing cliffs and in disturbed areas in forest and woodland and is mainly found in the Blue Mountains and sometimes on the central coast of New South Wales.

References

longisepala
Pittosporaceae
Plants described in 1926
Flora of New South Wales
Taxa named by Karel Domin